Hof, in Öræfi, is a cluster of farms in the municipality of Sveitarfélagið Hornafjörður in southeast Iceland, close to Vatnajökull glacier, and twenty two kilometres south of Skaftafell in Vatnajökull National Park. It is on the Route 1 southwest of Höfn, in the narrow strip between the sea coast and the glacier.

It is 9.14 km WSW of the centre of Öræfajökull volcano.

A notable building in Hof is a turf church, which was built in 1883 and is the youngest turf church in Iceland. Since 1951, it belongs to the National Museum of Iceland.

References

Populated places in Eastern Region (Iceland)